The following is a list of events affecting 2016 in Indian television.

Television series debuts
Aamar Durga 
Agar Tum Saath Ho

Television series endings
4 the People (TV series)
Aaj Ki Raat Hai Zindagi

Television seasons
24 (Indian TV series)
Adaalat (season 2)
Bigg Boss 10
Bigg Boss Kannada 3
Dance Plus (season 2)
Fear Factor: Khatron Ke Khiladi 7
India's Got Talent (season 7)
India's Next Top Model (cycle 2)
Jhalak Dikhhla Jaa (season 9)
MasterChef India Season 5
MTV Roadies (season 13)
The Voice (India season 2)

References

 
2016 in India
Entertainment in India
Indian culture